Mueang Chaiyaphum is the capital district (amphoe mueang) of Chaiyaphum province, northeastern Thailand. Chaiyaphum Municipality is the seat of provincial government and its largest city.

History
The history of the city of Chaiyaphum dates back to the Dvaravati era. In the early years of the Ayutthaya Kingdom, Chaiyaphum was still controlled by the Lao Lan Xang Kingdom. After the Ayutthaya Kingdom conquered Vientiane, Laotians traveling through the area settled to form the town.

Around the year 1817, a Mr. Lae led a group of Laotian people from Vientiane across the Mekong River to find fertile ground. They finally settled in the area of Ban Luang. King Anouvong of Lan Xang consulted with King Rama III to promote Lae to be Khun Phakdi Chumphon. Later he was promoted to be the governor of Chaiyaphum as Phraya Phakdi Chumphon. When King Anouvong declared war on Siam in an attempt to regain independence, Phraya Phakdi Chumphon changed allegiance and supported the Siamese troops. He was killed by King Anouvong. When King Chulalongkorn reformed the government administration, Chaiyaphum was included in Monthon Nakhon Ratchasima.

Geography
Neighboring districts are (from the north clockwise) Kaset Sombun, Kaeng Khro, and Khon Sawan of Chaiyaphum Province, Kaeng Sanam Nang and Ban Lueam of Nakhon Ratchasima province, and Noen Sa-nga, Ban Khwao and Nong Bua Daeng.

Phu Laen Kha and Tat Ton National Parks are in Mueang Chaiyaphum District.

Administration
The district is divided into 19 sub-districts (tambons), which are further subdivided into 216 villages (mubans). Chaiyaphum itself has town (thesaban mueang) status, and administers tambon Nai Mueang. Ban Khai has township (thesaban tambon) status and covers parts of tambon Ban Khai.

References

External links
 Phu Laen Kha National Park
 Tat Ton National Park

Mueang Chaiyaphum